The European Travel Commission (ETC) is an association of National Tourism Organisations (NTOs) based in Brussels. It was created in 1948 to promote Europe as a tourist destination to long-haul markets outside of Europe, originally the US and later Canada, Latin America and Asia-Pacific. ETC currently has 33 member NTOs and 14 associate members from the private industry. The association aims to raise awareness of the importance of tourism among national European authorities and the general public through sharing best practices and cooperation in market intelligence and promotion.

Members 
ETC membership comprises 33 National Tourism Organisations (NTOs) from 32 European countries, 7 of which from outside the EU. ETC member countries are: Austria, Belgium, Bulgaria, Croatia, Cyprus, Czech Republic, Denmark, Estonia, Finland, Germany, Greece, Hungary, Iceland, Ireland, Italy, Latvia, Lithuania, Luxembourg, Malta, Monaco, Montenegro, Netherlands, Norway, Poland, Portugal, Romania, San Marino, Serbia, Slovakia, Slovenia, Spain, and Switzerland.

In 2015, ETC launched an associate membership programme extending membership to private organisations and academia to seek cooperation, and support in strengthening the sustainable development of Europe as a tourist destination. As of 2019, ETC has 14 associate members: ADARA, Amadeus IT Group S.A., Airbnb, Confcommercio, CrowdRiff Inc., Emirates Airline Company/Emirates Group, Eurail Group G.I.E., Expedia Inc., Global Blue S.A., HiSeas International, Sojern Ltd, Value Retail PLC, Travel Consul, and Welcome Chinese.

History

1948–1952: Early Years of ETC 
ETC was established in Stalheim, Norway, during an excursion of the 1948 Congress of the International Union of Official Travel Organizations (IUOTO). ETC became IUOTO's regional commission for Europe in line with the latter's aim “to promote, in a technical and entirely non-political manner, freedom of travel, so as to strengthen peace and mutual understanding between the nations of the world.”

Committed to the freedom of travel and private enterprise, ETC did not escape the reality of the early Cold War and cultivated strong ties with the Western camp. The 17 original member countries were recipients of aid from the Marshall Plan, and in July 1948 ETC formalised its relationship with the Organization for European Economic Co-operation (OEEC) to supply the OEEC with expert knowledge on tourism matters. Recognising the importance of tourism for the economic reconstruction of Europe, the OEEC Executive Committee established a Tourism Committee in February 1949.

1950s–1960s: Joint Publicity Campaigns in the United States, Facilitating Travel 
Under OEEC oversight, joint publicity campaigns in the US turned into the flagship activity of ETC. The first campaign took place from August to December 1949. The campaigns promoted Europe as one destination in the American market and encouraged off-season travel. The campaigns were realised by the ETC's New York Committee working closely with marketing firms (e.g. Donald N. Martin & Company, Inc.) and private partners in the transportation, travel, and energy industries. Additionally, ETC participated in travel fairs; published brochures and calendars of events; produced radio broadcasts, television advertising, short films, it also published advertisements in newspapers and magazines.

In May 1954, an ETC delegation met with President Dwight D. Eisenhower.  ETC praised Eisenhower for his strong support for international travel by Americans in the interest of rebuilding the European economies.  However, concerns in the American administration over the deficit in the country's balance of payments prompted the Kennedy administration to create the United States Travel Service in June 1961 to motivate foreign nationals to visit the US. At around the same time the reorganisation of the OEEC into the OECD ended its involvement in the publicity campaigns, which continued under the aegis of ETC alone from 1964. ETC continued to defend the freedom to travel when President Lyndon B. Johnson’s 1968 State of the Union address asked Americans to reduce non-essential travel.  In response ETC published a Declaration on the Freedom to Travel in February 1968 that identified the freedom to travel as a fundamental human right, to be enjoyed without restriction or discrimination.

ETC also sought to facilitate travel and border crossings through abolishing visa requirements to travel to Europe and between European countries and by alleviating currency regulations, travel taxes, and customs formalities. By the mid-1950s, North American and Western European tourists could travel through Western Europe without major administrative formalities. Following the 1963 United Nations Conference on International Travel and Tourism, ETC pushed for discussions on the recommendations of the conference to remove obstacles (visas, customs rules, border-crossing requirements) and streamline tourism regulations, implementing those regulations within the IUOTO and the OECD Tourism Committee.

ETC and Eastern Europe during the Cold War 
In 1951, ETC welcomed Finland, Spain, and Yugoslavia to its membership. This decision was undoubtedly related to Cold War imperatives, and in the context of the rift caused by the 1948 Tito–Stalin split, Yugoslavia's membership of ETC was a steppingstone for the country's tourism policy, which aimed to attract more Western tourists. While Yugoslavia was the only socialist country to join the organisation, ETC initially viewed the application for membership from the Soviet Union and Poland after joining IUOTO in 1955 positively for their potential impact on the development of tourism before deciding their membership could be detrimental. Instead IUOTO created a Regional Commission for European Travel composed of national tourism boards from both Western and Eastern Europe while the joint publicity campaigns in the US continued under a separate organisation that kept the already well-known name of the “European Travel Commission.

1970s–1980s: From a Transatlantic to a Global Player 
In the early 1970s ETC obtained a presidency supported by vice presidents and permanent secretariat at the same time  Malta (1971) and Cyprus (1973) became member countries. ETC added the preservation of cultural heritage to its mission in collaboration with Europa Nostra, a pan-European federation for cultural heritage. During the 1970s ETC capitalised on new technological opportunities from transportation to ICT technologies and facilitated the exchange of information and experiences among its members on these subjects. The creation of Operation Groups in Japan, Argentina, Canada, and Australia in the 1970s, and the ETC’s increasing interest in Southeast Asian markets in the 1980s expanded ETC’s geographic scope.

The 1970s also signalled the beginning of a long-standing collaboration with the European Economic Community (EEC). In the 1980s, the EEC engaged more directly with tourism and ETC with research initiatives and grant support. The European Parliament identified, for instance, “ETC as best placed for the coordination of overseas promotion of tourism to the EEC.” In 1981, ETC also co-founded the European Tourism Action Group, a group of associations advocating for the importance of Europe as a tourist destination.

1990s–2000s: ETC in Europe after the Cold War 
The Fall of the Berlin Wall in November 1989, the dissolution of the Soviet Union in 1991, and the transformation of the European Economic Community (EEC) into the European Union in 1993 with the Treaty of Maastricht entailed a significant expansion of ETC's membership starting with Hungary in 1990, and a consolidation of the relationship with European institutions. Throughout the 1990s, ETC sought to give tourism broader recognition on the EU level. When the Treaty of Lisbon took effect in 2009, tourism was added as a policy domain in which the EU could intervene through article 195 of the Treaty on the Functioning of the European Union.  Meanwhile, ETC continued its research agenda in collaborations with the United Nations World Tourism Organization (UNWTO) and the European Tourism Association (ETOA).  It increasingly paid attention to travel-related computer technologies and online marketing strategies. ETC launched its first website in January 1996, which was fully revamped in 2006 with the help of European Commission funds. The VisitEurope.com website is currently ETC's main platform for the promotion of Destination Europe.

Current Activities
The promotion of Europe as a tourist destination continues to be the ETC's flagship activity. In 2019, ETC launched a new marketing strategy, Horizon 2022, moving from a traditional geographic segmentation to a cross-market thematic promotional approach. Instead of presenting Europe as a sum of destinations, the new strategy promotes the continent as a sum of experiences and interests in multiple destinations around the continent.

Market intelligence underpins ETC's marketing strategies and services. ETC's analysis of tourism market trends and relevant outbound markets aim to help the organisation and its members to understand the business environment, detect growth opportunities and formulate suitable promotional strategies. In research ETC collaborates with the United Nations World Tourism Organization (UNWTO), World Travel and Tourism Council (WTTC), European Tourism Association (ETOA), Eurail Group G.I.E, International Air Transport Association (IATA), TourMIS, Tourism Economics, STR, ForwardKeys, Amadeus, and others.

ETC continues to be an advocate for the freedom to travel and for the recognition of tourism as an essential sector of the economy. Sustainability, visa facilitation and connectivity currently constitute the triple focus of ETC's advocacy work. ETC currently holds the Chairmanship and Secretariat of the Tourism Manifesto, launched in 2015 and supported by over 50 public and private stakeholders from the tourism sector. The Manifesto highlights the key EU policy priorities for the sector on topics ranging from skills and qualifications to sustainability and competitiveness of Europe's tourism.

ETC and the European Commission have established a long-term strategic partnership in promoting Destination Europe. In 2011, ETC and the European Commission agreed to work jointly to maintain Europe's position as the world's leading tourist destination by promoting the Destination Europe brand and supporting the sustainable competitive development of the sector. Since 2012, the European Commission has entrusted ETC with yearly ad hoc grants for the implementation of a programme of promotional actions aimed at bringing new visitors from targeted third countries to Europe. In 2017, ETC was designated as the official strategic partner of the European Commission for the implementation of the promotional activities in the framework of the 2018 EU-China Tourism Year. Additionally, ETC collaborates with other EU institutions such as the European Parliament in its efforts to further advance tourism policies at EU level.

Organisational Aims and Structure 
The European Travel Commission is registered in Belgium as a non-profit international association. Its financial resources come from membership contributions. During past years, ETC was awarded EU funding on an ad hoc basis for the promotion of Destination Europe. ETC currently focuses its activities in the following areas:

 Marketing: ETC promotes Europe as a tourist destination in key third visitor markets on behalf of its member organisations. It undertakes regional trade and global consumer marketing campaigns to promote Destination Europe.
 Research: ETC analyses tourism market trends to identify fast-growing outbound markets. ETC research activities aim to deliver the intelligence support necessary to keep a competitive edge in the global tourism market.
 Advocacy: In close collaboration with the travel industry, ETC raises awareness among public authorities and the wider public across Europe of the economic and broader importance of tourism.

ETC activities are implemented by the Executive Unit based in Brussels under the guidance of the Board of Directors, and with the support of a number of expert groups: the Market Intelligence Group, the Marketing Group, and the Operations Groups.

General Meeting and Board of Directors 
ETC organises a General Meeting twice a year to decide on the budget and the programme of work. The Board of Directors is the ETC's steering committee and consists of a maximum 14 members (senior executives representing member NTOs), out of which 7 are non-permanent members. The permanent members are Austria, Belgium, Germany, Italy, and Spain. Non-permanent members rotate every 2 years and come from one of each of the 7 geographic groups. In 2017, the CEO of Visit Flanders (Belgium), Peter De Wilde, was re-elected as the ETC President for a 3-year term.

Executive Unit 
The Executive Unit administers the organisation from its headquarters in Brussels under the leadership of the Executive Director. In 2012, Eduardo Santander was appointed as the Executive Director of ETC.

The Marketing Group and the Market Intelligence Group 
The Marketing Group is the ETC's think tank for all issues related to the promotion of Europe as a destination and a platform for sharing information and best practices. The Market Intelligence Group consists of the research directors of the member NTOs and is responsible for the ETC's research programme.

Operations Groups 
ETC has set up Operations Groups in its key markets. The first Operations Group was set up, and continues to exist, in New York. The US Operations Group also served the Canadian market until a separate Operations Group was set up in 1978. Other Operations Groups are currently active in Brazil and China. Each Operations Group is responsible for a joint programme of activities for the promotion of Destination Europe in their respective markets.

See also
 Association of Special Fares Agents
 European Distance and E-learning Network
 Vacation Saga

References

Non-profit organizations based in Europe
Organizations established in 1948
Tourism agencies
Tourism in Europe